Syed Zafar Ali Shah is a Pakistani politician who has served as member of the National Assembly of Pakistan between 1985 and 1998. A member of Pakistan Tehreek e Insaf, Shah previously served as the Deputy Speaker of the National Assembly from 1993 to 1996.

Education
He graduated with M.A and LL.B degrees.

Political career
Shah was elected to the  Provincial Assembly of NWFP in Pakistani general election, 1962 and again in 1970 Pakistani general election. He has held the position of Deputy Speaker of  Provincial Assembly of Sindh from 1962 to 1965 and Provincial Minister for Food, Forests, Livestocks and Fisheries, Sindh, in 1984. Shah was elected to the National Assembly of Pakistan for the first time in 1985 Pakistani general election and appointed as Federal Minister for Industries, Food, Agriculture and Livestock in 1985. He was re-elected to the National Assembly of Pakistan in 1988 Pakistani general election, and appointed as Federal Minister of State for Water and Power in 1989. He was re-elected to the National Assembly of Pakistan from NA-159 constituency on PPP ticket in 1990 Pakistani general election, and in 1993 Pakistani general election. He held the position of National Assembly Deputy Speaker in 1993. He was elected to the National Assembly from NA-212 (Naushero Feroze-II) on PPP ticket in 2002 Pakistani general election. He was re-elected to the National Assembly from NA-212 (Naushero Feroze-II) on PPP ticket in 2008 Pakistani general election.

In 2013, he left PPP to join Pakistan Muslim League N. He ran for the seat of National Assembly from NA-212 (Naushero Feroze-II) on PML-N ticket in 2013 Pakistani general election but was unsuccessful.

References

Pakistani MNAs 1985–1988
Members of the Provincial Assembly of Sindh
People from Naushahro Feroze District
1932 births
Living people
Sindhi people
Pakistan People's Party politicians
Deputy Speakers of the National Assembly of Pakistan
Deputy Speakers of the Provincial Assembly of West Pakistan